Vinton-Shellsburg Community School District (VSCSD) is a school district headquartered in Vinton, Iowa.

Most of the district is in Benton County with a small section in Buchanan County. In addition to Vinton it serves Shellsburg and Garrison.

The district was established on July 1, 1993, by the merger of the Vinton Community School District and the Shellsburg Community School District.

History

Mary Jo Hainstock became the superintendent circa 2009 and is scheduled to end her job in 2020. Kyle Koeppen, the principal of Prairie Point Middle School in Cedar Rapids, replaced her as of July 1.

Schools
 Vinton-Shellsburg High School
 Vinton-Shellsburg Middle School
 Shellsburg Elementary School
 Tilford Elementary School

Previously, it also operated Tilford Middle School, West Elementary School, and East/Lincoln Center.

Vinton-Shellsburg High School

Athletics
The Vikings compete in the WaMaC Conference in the following sports:

Baseball
 1998 Class 3A State Champions 
Basketball (boys and girls)
Girls' State Champions - 1984, 1995 
Bowling
Cross Country (boys and girls)
Football
Golf (boys and girls)
Soccer (boys and girls)
Softball
Swimming (boys and girls)
Tennis (boys and girls)
Track and Field (boys and girls)
Volleyball
Wrestling

Notable alumni
Desi Druschel, baseball coach

References

External links
 Vinton-Shellsburg Community School District

See also
List of school districts in Iowa
List of high schools in Iowa

School districts in Iowa
Education in Benton County, Iowa
Education in Buchanan County, Iowa
1993 establishments in Iowa
School districts established in 1993
Vinton, Iowa